Dugarajapatnam Port is a proposed seaport in Tirupati district of Andhra Pradesh, India. Construction was expected to start in 2020 and finish in 2023. The port is set up under India's Companies Act 1956 with equity participation of the government of Andhra Pradesh.

Relocation 

The construction encountered certain objections as the sensitive ecosystem of Pulicat Lake and the satellite launching station ISRO of Sriharikota are very near to Duggarajapatnam. After environmental and forest clearances, the location was shifted to Vagarru at Tupilipalem village. Tupilipalem is located 20 km from Dugarajapatnam, but the port will be still be referred to as Dugarajapatnam Port.

References

Ports and harbours of Andhra Pradesh
Buildings and structures in Nellore district
Transport in Nellore district